Yerjet Yerzat or Yeerjieti Yeerzati (born 4 January 1993 in Tacheng), also known as Jet in Portugal, is a Chinese footballer of Kazakh descent who plays as a left-footed goalkeeper for Chinese Super League side Chongqing Dangdai Lifan.

Club career
Yerjet started his professional football career in 2012 when he joined China League Two side Xinjiang Begonia for the 2012 China League Two. He made twenty-three appearances in the 2012 season. However, he became an unattached player after Xinjiang quit from the league in 2013 due to financial difficulties.

Yerjet moved to Portugal and signed a half-year contract with Campeonato de Portugal side Gondomar in January 2014. He quickly established himself within the team and made his senior debut in Portugal on 13 April 2014 in a 2–1 home defeat against Amarante. Yerjet made five league appearances in the 2013–14 season and extended his contract with the club. He transferred to first tier side Paços de Ferreira along with teammate Tang Shi in the summer of 2016.

Yerjet joined LigaPro side Leixões in July 2017. On 20 September 2017, he made his debut for the club in a 1–0 home win against Paços de Ferreira in the group stage of 2017–18 Taça da Liga. He made his league debut on 26 November 2017 in a 0–0 home draw against Benfica B. Yerjet terminated his contract with the club and received trial with Chinese Super League side Tianjin Quanjian in January 2018. However, Leixões stated that Tianjin Quanjian contact the player illegally before he terminated his contract. His transfer deal was eventually suspended at the end of January 2018.

Yerjet signed a short term contract with Campeonato de Portugal side Salgueiros in February 2018. On 11 February 2018, he made his debut in a 3–0 home win against Cinfães, ending Salgueiros' five-game winless streak. He kept consecutive clean sheets in his first six matches for the club and was chosen in the best team of round in his first four matches.

Yerjet rejoined Gondomar in the summer of 2018, signing a one-year contract. On 11 August 2018, he made his return debut in a 2–1 home win over Amarante. He played every minute of Gondomar's official matches in the 2018–19 season before he returned to China in February 2019.

On 22 February 2019, Yerjet transferred to Chinese Super League side Chongqing Dangdai Lifan.

Career statistics

References

External links
Yerjet Yerzat at Worldfootball.net

1993 births
Living people
People from Ili
Chinese footballers
Footballers from Xinjiang
Kazakhs in China
Chinese people of Kazakhstani descent
Association football goalkeepers
F.C. Paços de Ferreira players
Gondomar S.C. players
Leixões S.C. players
S.C. Salgueiros players
Chongqing Liangjiang Athletic F.C. players
China League Two players
Chinese Super League players
Liga Portugal 2 players
Chinese expatriate footballers
Expatriate footballers in Portugal
Chinese expatriate sportspeople in Portugal